The Australian Freedom of Information Commissioner is an independent statutory office-holder appointed under subsection 14(2) of the Australian Information Commissioner Act 2010.  The Freedom of Information Commissioner is one of three commissioners in the Office of the Australian Information Commissioner and has functions relating to freedom of information and privacy.

Dr James Popple was the first Australian Freedom of Information Commissioner, appointed in 2010.
Leo Hardiman is the second FOI Commissioner, appointed in April 2022, after the office had been vacant for more than seven years.

References

External links
Office of the Australian Information Commissioner website

Government of Australia